Subulussalam (Jawoë: سبل السلام) is a city in the south of Aceh province of Indonesia. It is located inland on the island of Sumatra. On 2 January 2007, the provincial government of Aceh declared Subulussalam to be an independent city as a result of the administration being separated from that of Aceh Singkil Regency. of which it was formerly a part. It covers an area of 1,391 km2, and it had a population of 67,446 at the 2010 Census and of 90,751 at the 2020 Census; the official estimate as at mid 2021 was 92,671. As a result, Subulussalam is the most sparsely-populated city in Indonesia, with density of only 67 people.

Administrative Districts 
Subulussalam city consists of five districts (kecamatan), tabulated below with their areas and population totals from the 2010 Census and the 2020 Census, together with the official estimates for mid 2021. The table also includes the number of administrative villages (urban kelurahan) in each district, and its postal codes.

Climate
Subulussalam has a tropical rainforest climate (Af) with heavy to very heavy rainfall year-round.

See also 

 List of regencies and cities of Indonesia

References 

Cities in Aceh
Populated places in Aceh